Jos Ruijs (born 18 March 1955) is a Dutch rower. He competed in the men's coxed four event at the 1976 Summer Olympics.

References

1955 births
Living people
Dutch male rowers
Olympic rowers of the Netherlands
Rowers at the 1976 Summer Olympics
People from Zeist
Sportspeople from Utrecht (province)